Borsonella galapagana is a species of sea snail, a marine gastropod mollusk in the family Borsoniidae.

Description
The shell grows to a length of 15 mm.

Distribution
This species occurs in the Pacific Ocean off the Galapagos Islands.

References

 McLean, J.H. & Poorman, R. (1971) New species of tropical Eastern Pacific Turridae. The Veliger, 14, 89–113.

External links
 

galapagana
Gastropods described in 1971